Paola María Genes Garcete (born 14 June 1991) is a Paraguayan footballer who plays as a centre back for Libertad/Limpeño. She was a member of the Paraguay women's national team.

International career
Genes represented Paraguay at the 2008 FIFA U-17 Women's World Cup. At senior level, she played two Copa América Femenina editions (2010 and 2018).

References

1991 births
Living people
Women's association football central defenders
Paraguayan women's footballers
Paraguay women's international footballers
Cerro Porteño players
Deportivo Capiatá players
20th-century Paraguayan women
21st-century Paraguayan women